The following are the records of Puerto Rico in Olympic weightlifting. Records are maintained in each weight class for the snatch lift, clean and jerk lift, and the total for both lifts by the Federación de Levantamiento de Pesas de Puerto Rico, Inc.

Men

Women

References

records
Puerto Rico
Olympic weightlifting
weightlifting